Kayoko Kawahigashi is a former Japanese international table tennis player.

Table tennis career
She won a bronze medal at the 1979 World Table Tennis Championships in the Corbillon Cup (women's team event) with Yoshiko Shimauchi, Kayo Sugaya and Shoko Takahashi for Japan.

She also won the 1985 US Open singles and doubles titles.

See also
 List of World Table Tennis Championships medalists

References

1958 births
Japanese female table tennis players
Living people
World Table Tennis Championships medalists